Kluane / Wrangell–St. Elias / Glacier Bay / Tatshenshini-Alsek is an international park system located in Canada and the United States, at the border of Yukon, Alaska and British Columbia.

It was declared a UNESCO World Heritage Site in 1994 for the spectacular glacier and icefield landscapes as well as for the importance of grizzly bears, caribou and Dall sheep habitat.

It is home to a number of notable landforms, including: the world's largest non-polar icefield; the largest piedmont glacier in the world, Malaspina Glacier; the world's longest interior valley glacier, Nabesna Glacier; as well as Canada's highest peak and North America's second-highest peak, Mount Logan, at 5,959 m (19,551 ft).

Park system 
The international system comprises parks located in two countries and three administrative regions:
 Kluane National Park and Reserve (Canada)
 Wrangell–St. Elias National Park and Preserve (U.S.)
 Glacier Bay National Park and Preserve (U.S.)
 Tatshenshini-Alsek Provincial Park (provincial park, British Columbia, Canada)

See also 
 Waterton–Glacier International Peace Park, the other USA–Canada World Heritage Site.
 Peace Arch Park, another park jointly designated and managed by the US and Canada.

References

World Heritage Sites in the United States
World Heritage Sites in Canada

Kluane National Park and Reserve
Ice fields of North America
Protected areas established in 1979
1979 establishments in Alaska
1979 establishments in British Columbia
1979 establishments in Yukon